Charles Mitchell (born October 23, 1993) is an American basketball player for Oberá Tenis Club of the Liga Nacional de Básquet (LNB). He typically plays as either a power forward or as a center, and has played professionally in Taiwan, the Netherlands, the Czech Republic, Japan, Uruguay, Mexico, and Argentina.

Early life and high school
Mitchell is from Marietta, Georgia and was born on October 23, 1993, one of three children of Harriett Mitchell. He attended Joseph Wheeler High School, graduating in 2012.

College career
Mitchell began his collegiate career at Maryland. As a sophomore, he averaged 6.5 points and 6.3 rebounds per game. Following the season he transferred to the Georgia Institute of Technology to be closer to his ailing grandmother, and he played for its Yellow Jackets basketball team. He averaged 10.1 points and 9.7 rebounds per game as a senior before graduating in 2016.

Professional career
Mitchell began his professional basketball career with the Dutch basketball team Den Bosch in late 2016. He played for Den Bosch until 2017. Mitchell played for the Argentine basketball team Ferro in 2018 and the Czech basketball team BK Olomoucko from 2017 to 2018.

Mitchell played for Bank of Taiwan during the 2019–20 season, averaging 18.5 points, 12 rebounds, 2.7 assists and 1.7 steals per game. In 2020, he signed with the Niigata Albirex BB in Japan and played one game. On October 31, 2020, Mitchell signed with Nacional of the Liga Uruguaya de Básquetbol.

In 2022, Mitchell played for the Argentine club Oberá Tenis Club. He also played in the 2022 Liga Sudamericana de Básquetbol, where he averaged 18.1 points per game, the most in the league. After the tournament, Mitchell was named to the All-Tournament Team.

References

External links
Charles Mitchell at RealGM

1993 births
Living people
American expatriate basketball people in Argentina
American expatriate basketball people in the Czech Republic
American expatriate basketball people in Japan
American expatriate basketball people in Mexico
American expatriate basketball people in the Netherlands
American expatriate basketball people in Taiwan
American expatriate basketball people in Uruguay
Basketball players from Georgia (U.S. state)
Georgia Tech Yellow Jackets men's basketball players
Dorados de Chihuahua (LNBP) players
Maryland Terrapins men's basketball players
Heroes Den Bosch players
Dutch Basketball League players
Club Nacional de Football (basketball) players
Bank of Taiwan basketball players
Super Basketball League imports